Friederike Abt (born 7 July 1994) is a German footballer. She plays as a goalkeeper for Bayer Leverkusen in the Frauen-Bundesliga.  She was a member of the German Under-19 national team that won the 2011 U-19 European Championship.

Career

Clubs 
Abt began her career in 2000 at FC Altenhagen. She switched to Herforder SV in 2005, where she was active in the youth division. Already in the 2010/2011 season, she was promoted to the professional squad of Herford and made her Bundesliga debut on March 6, 2011 in the 4-2 defeat in the away game against SGS Essen-Schoenebeck. Bottom of the table, the club was relegated from the Bundesliga after one season. In the 2011/12 second division season, Abt was the first-choice goalkeeper until she tore a cruciate ligament in January 2012 and was out for more than half a year. At the beginning of the 2012/13 season, she first made a few appearances for Herford's second team in the Westphalian League, but tore her cruciate ligament again. She made her comeback in March 2014. On April 23, 2015, Abt announced her move to TSG 1899 Hoffenheim after 10 years at Herforder SV Borussia.  At Hoffenheim, she made irregular appearances in her first two seasons in the Bundesliga, but she has been the first-choice goalkeeper since the 2017/18 season. For the 2019/20 season she moved to VfL Wolfsburg.  She was in goal at the 2020 Champions League finals in Spain, second-choice to Katarzyna Kiedrzynek. In the summer of 2021 she joined Bayer 04 Leverkusen.

National Team 
She made her international debut on 15 April 2009, when she kept goal in Germany's U-15 team's 5-0 win over the Netherlands in Rhede.

She made her debut for the U-17 national team on September 6, 2009 in a 10-0 win over Israel. She took part in the 2010 U-17 European Championship in Switzerland and came in third. She played in the 2010 U-17 World Cup, in a 10-1 win over South Africa.  In 2011 she was again in the squad for the U-17 European Championship, where the team finished third. In total, Abt completed seven games for the U-17 national team.

She made her debut for the U19 national team on May 11, 2011 in a 5-0 win over Russia. In the same year she was part of the German squad for the U19 European Championship in Italy, where she played in the third group game in the 2-1 win against the Netherlands on June 5.

On 19 October 2020, she was called up to replace the injured Ann-Katrin Berger for the national team friendly against England.  However, the game was canceled by the English association on October 25 because a member of the support staff tested positive for the corona virus.

Honours
VfL Wolfsburg
Frauen-Bundesliga: Winner 2019-20
DFB-Pokal: Winner 2019-20

Germany
FIFA U-17 World Cup: Third place 2008
UEFA Under-19 European Championship: Winner 2011
UEFA Under-17 European Championship: Third place 2010, 2011

References

External links
Profile at the German Football Federation

1994 births
Living people
TSG 1899 Hoffenheim (women) players
VfL Wolfsburg (women) players
Frauen-Bundesliga players
German women's footballers
Germany women's youth international footballers
Sportspeople from Bielefeld
Bayer 04 Leverkusen (women) players

Germany international footballers
Association football goalkeepers
Women's association football goalkeepers